Joseph William Hewitt (August 7, 1885 - April 2, 1948) was an American baseball shortstop in the Negro leagues. He played from 1910 to 1932 with several teams. It appears that most of his seasons were played with the St. Louis Giants and the Detroit Stars.

References

External links
 and Baseball-Reference Black Baseball stats and Seamheads
  and Seamheads

1885 births
1948 deaths
Chicago American Giants players
Birmingham Black Barons players
Lincoln Giants players
Indianapolis ABCs players
Detroit Stars players
Baseball players from Nashville, Tennessee
Baseball shortstops
St. Louis Giants players
Brooklyn Royal Giants players
St. Louis Stars (baseball) players
Milwaukee Bears players
Dayton Marcos players
Nashville Elite Giants players
Cleveland Cubs players
Negro league baseball managers
20th-century African-American people